Fatjesa Halil Gegollaj (born 5 November 2001) is a Kosovan-born Croatian professional footballer who plays as a left midfielder for Croatian club Split and the Croatia national team.

Club career

Early career and Rijeka
Gegollaj played football with boys in Zmaj until the moment when in the age of 12 became part of Marjan's youth team, where after three years it was transferred to Rijeka's youth team. After one year, she was promoted to the Rijeka's senior team due to good performances with youth team. On 1 November 2017, Gegollaj made her debut as professional footballer in a 1–1 away draw against Neretva after being named in the starting line-up. Eighteen days later, she scored her first goal for Rijeka in her seventh appearance for the club in a 20–0 home deep win over Viktorija in Croatian Women's First Football League.

Split
Gegollaj before the start of the 2018–19 season joined with Croatian Women's First Football League club Split. On 23 September 2018, she made her debut in a 0–5 away win against her former club Rijeka after being named in the starting line-up. Twenty days later, Gegollaj scored her first goals for Split in her second appearance for the club in a 0–8 away win over her former club Marjan in Croatian Women's First Football League.

International career
From 2015, until 2020, Gegollaj has been part of Croatia at youth international level, respectively has been part of the U15, U16, U17 and U19 teams and she with these teams played 25 matches. On 1 April 2019, Gegollaj was named as part of the Croatia squad for 2019 Wuhan International Tournament. Six days later, she made her debut with Croatia in 2019 Wuhan International Tournament third-place playoff match against Russia after coming on as a substitute at 82nd minute in place of Ana Dujmović.

Personal life
Gegollaj was born in Prizren, FR Yugoslavia (modern-day Kosovo) to Kosovar Albanian parents who lived and worked in Makarska, Croatia.

Career statistics

Club

International

References

External links

2001 births
Living people
People from Prizren
Croatian women's footballers
Croatia women's international footballers
Croatian people of Kosovan descent
Croatian people of Albanian descent
Kosovan women's footballers
Kosovan emigrants to Croatia
Women's association football midfielders
Croatian Women's First Football League players
ŽNK Rijeka players
ŽNK Split players

Kosovo Albanians